Desmethoxyyangonin or 5,6-dehydrokavain is one of the six main kavalactones found in the Piper methysticum (kava) plant.

Pharmacology
Desmethoxyyangonin is a reversible inhibitor of monoamine oxidase B (MAO-B). Kava is able to increase dopamine levels in the nucleus accumbens and desmethoxyyangonin likely contributes to this effect. This, along with several other catecholamines, may be responsible for the purported attention-promoting effects of kava.

Unlike the other major kavalactones, desmethoxyyangonin does not appear to act as a GABAA receptor positive allosteric modulator.

Desmethoxyyangonin has marked activity on the induction of CYP3A23.

See also
Kavain

References

Monoamine oxidase inhibitors
Kavalactones
Alkene derivatives
Ethers
Nootropics